Franz Vetter (3 December 1933 – 21 October 2009) was an Austrian skier. He competed at the 1964 Winter Olympics and the 1968 Winter Olympics.

References

External links
 

1933 births
2009 deaths
Austrian male biathletes
Austrian male cross-country skiers
Olympic biathletes of Austria
Olympic cross-country skiers of Austria
Biathletes at the 1968 Winter Olympics
Cross-country skiers at the 1964 Winter Olympics
Cross-country skiers at the 1968 Winter Olympics
Sportspeople from Tyrol (state)
20th-century Austrian people